Aliah University (AU) is a state government controlled autonomous university in New Town, West Bengal, India. Previously known as Mohammedan College of Calcutta, it was elevated to university in 2008. It offers undergraduate and postgraduate programs in different Engineering, Arts, Science, Management and Nursing subjects.

History
The Aliah University (AU) is one of the oldest modern-style educational institutes in Asia, and first in India. It was set up in October 1780 by Warren Hastings, the British Governor general of East India Company near Sealdah in Calcutta. A number of titles were used for it, such as Islamic College of Calcutta, Calcutta Madrasah, Calcutta Mohammedan College and Madrasah-e-Aliah. Of these, Calcutta Mohammedan College was that used by Warren Hastings.

The original building was completed in 1782 at Bow Bazaar (near Sealdah). The college moved to its campus on Wellesley Square in the 1820s. Initially it taught natural philosophy, Arabic, Persian, theology and Islamic Law, astronomy, Grammar, logic, arithmetic, geometry, rhetoric and oratory. The Calcutta Madrasa followed different models for different subjects, like Dars-i Nizami of Firingi Mahal for Persian and Arabic, and the old Peripatetic School Model for the Logic and Philosophy.

The first head preceptor of the college was Mulla Majduddin, a well-known personality and erudite in the Islamic learning of that time in Bengal. In 1791, he was replaced by Muhammad Ismail because of allegations of mismanagement. Captain Ayron, a British army officer, was appointed in 1819 as the first secretary by the East India Company, to take control of the administration of the Madrasa, and he was in that position until 1842. Ayron made several reforms: the first annual examination of the madrasah was held on 15 August 1827, and the first medical class of India was instituted in 1826 under Peter Breton, the professor of medicine. After 10 years of medical classes, the administration of the Madrasa decided to establish the separate Calcutta Medical College in 1836. The Madrasah students could still study medical subjects at the Calcutta Medical College. Introduction of elementary English courses was also started in college in 1826 under his administration but this English course was not to get huge success. Nawab Abdul Latif and Waheedunnabi were the first English scholars from this college. Dr. Aloys Sprenger was appointed as a Principal for the first time in 1850 to resist the college from a current of continuing deterioration. In 1854, another reform attempt consisting of opening the Anglo-Persian department to make English as an official language under the direct control of Calcutta Madrasah College. The college failed to create enthusiasm. FA level college classes added to the Calcutta Madrasa in 1863, this reform also failed. After the Dr. Aloys Sprenger, few other European Principals was appointed and AH Harley [1910-11] was the last European Principals of this Madrasa. One by one failure of the reforms of Madras and after 1857, the year of the Sepoy Mutiny, the British Government started to see the Muslim community of the Bengal as constant suspicion. Lord Macaulay was a British Whig politician and historian, who advised the British Government to introduce English education to produce to Anglicized Indians. The main aim of this was to extend the British influence into vast areas of India. Then British Government was decided to establish the Calcutta University in 1857. After the establishment of the Calcutta University created a precarious position for the Calcutta Madrasah. There were a number of proposals for closure to Calcutta university to British Authority in India, but the Authority allowed it to continue to function with only a traditional Madrasah teaching Arabic and Sharia Laws. Thus from the year 1857, the Calcutta Madrasa grew up as a separate stream in the education system of the Indian subcontinent. Shamsul Ulema Kamaluddin Ahmed was appointed as the first Indian principal of the Calcutta Madrasah College in 1927. In this same year, the first madrasah education board was established (called Board of Central Madrasah Examinations) for the conducting various examinations the Alim, Fazil, Kamil and Mumtazul Muhaddesin. The year of 1947 in which portion of India took place was very painful in the history of the Calcutta Madras in Bengal. All moveable properties like large numbers manuscripts and books were transferred to East Bengal (Now Bangladesh) at Dhaka madrasah and other things became topsy-turvy. Later in 1949 with help of Maulana Abul Kalam Azad, the Calcutta Madrasah was reopened. Now the Calcutta Madrasah was elevated to the university as the Aliah University under West Bengal state government controlled minority autonomous university in 2008. The newly set up buildings of Aliah University are located in Taltala, Park Circus and New Town in Kolkata. The New Town campus is used for Science, technology students and the main office while the Park circus campus and Taltala campus Nursing and Arts students, and the Islamic Theology students. Now this university offers undergraduate, postgraduate and Doctorates programs in different Arts, Science, Management, Engineering, Nursing and Islamic theology subjects.

Campus
Aliah University has three campuses for different types of curriculum located at New Town, Park Circus and Taltala. 

Chief minister Mamata Banerjee of West Bengal laid the foundation stone of 'Aliah University Campus' at New Town on 15 December 2011. Later on 11 November 2014 Mamata Banerjee inaugurated the finished campus. New Town campus contains 156 class rooms with a capacity of 12,000 students and houses Science and Technology students only. The campus also has separate boy's and girl's hostel. New Town campus also has three annexure buildings dedicated to various laboratories and a central library.

The Park circus campus is used to house Arts & Nursing students, while the Taltala campus houses the Islamic Theology students and the main office.

Organisation and administration

Faculties & Departments

Academics

Admission
Admission to most undergraduate and postgraduate courses in Aliah University is granted through written entrance examinations and for B.Tech. programs through WBJEE. Admission to M.S. and PhD programmes is based on a written test and a personal interview.

Admission to undergraduate programmes is based on merit rank of the "Aliah University Admission Test" (AUAT), which consists of a written examination of "Multiple Choice Type Questions" (MCQ), clearing of which leads to an interview and final selection of the candidate. Candidates who qualify for admission through AUAT can apply for admission to LLM. (  Masters of Law  ), B.Tech. (Bachelor of Technology), Integrated MBA (Master of Business Administration), MCA (Master of Computer Applications), M.Sc. (Master of Science) and M.A (Master of Arts) courses in different Engineering, Business, Science and Arts subjects. Aliah University has also M.Tech. (Master of Technology) program.

Accreditation
The University Grants Commission (U.G.C.) accorded recognition to the university in terms of Section 12B of the U.G.C. Act, in 2019.

University library
Aliah University has three libraries in its three different campuses. All of them, the library of New Town Campus has a central library including 1.33 lac books.

Aliah University has a library rich in collection of literature in Islamic Theology, Islamic Jurisprudence & Law, and Arabic.

The library is now diversifying in the areas of Science, Engineering, Management Science, Humanities and Social Sciences.

Controversy and criticism
In 2016, a series of protests by the students of the university took place on the main campus (New Town) against the disordering principle of the then vice chancellor, Prof. Dr. Abu Taleb Khan; because students were experiencing lack of books in library, lack of faculty, bad condition of lab etc. from the beginning of the university. The protest began on 8 November 2016. On 18 November 2016, students insulted their VC Prof. Abu Taleb Khan giving a black rose to him. They blockaded the main gates of the university and the students made a loud slogan. With the help of police and security guards of the university, the VC entered in his office.

Students were requested by the EC members, Fact Finding Committee and also the Minority and Madrasah Education Minister Giasuddin Molla to stop the protest and class boycotts. But students said they will continue to boycott classes until the vice chancellor resigns.

Notable people

Alumni 
 Ismail Alam, teacher, poet and activist of the Khilafat Movement
 Syed Ameer Ali, jurist
 Shamsul Haque Faridpuri, educationist, and social reformer
 Syed Ahmad Hashmi, General Secretary of the Jamiat Ulama-e-Hind
 Mohammad Akram Khan, Bengali journalist
 Nawab Abdul Latif, educator and social worker in Bengal
 Sayeed Mohammed, Freedom Fighters and philanthropist
 Bhudev Mukhopadhyay, writer and intellectual in 19th century Bengal
 Shawkat Osman, novelist and short story writer
 Muhammad Qudrat-i-Khuda, organic chemist, educationist and writer
 Azangachhi Shaheb, Indian Sufi Saint
 Nawsad Siddique, member of the West Bengal Legislative Assembly
 Huseyn Shaheed Suhrawardy, Prime Minister of Bengal and a lawyer
 Ibrahim Suhrawardy, Indian educationist, author and linguist
 Ubaidullah Al Ubaidi Suhrawardy, educationist and writer

Faculty 
 Abu Nasr Waheed, Islamic scholar

See also

References

External links
 

 
Academic institutions associated with the Bengal Renaissance
Universities in Kolkata
1780 establishments in British India
Educational institutions established in 1780
Islamic universities and colleges in India